The Smugglers of Santa Cruz is a 1916 American silent short drama film directed by Donald MacDonald starring Charlotte Burton, Eugenie Forde, George Periolat, William Russell, and Roy Stewart.

External links

1916 films
1916 drama films
Silent American drama films
American silent short films
American black-and-white films
1916 short films
1910s American films